Refilwe Tebogo Tholekele (born 26 January 1996) is a Motswana footballer who plays as a forward for the Botswana women's national team.

References

1996 births
Living people
Botswana women's footballers
Women's association football forwards
Botswana women's international footballers
Botswana expatriate women's footballers
Expatriate women's footballers in Equatorial Guinea